Tha Ngon is a village in Vientiane Prefecture, Laos, It lies just north of the city of Vientiane and just to the south of the Nam Ngum River.

References

Populated places in Vientiane Province